Adas Bank is a submerged bank located off the west coast of India, between Angria Bank (200 km to the north) and Cora Divh bank of the Laccadive Islands (90 km to the south).

Geography
The nearest coast is the Indian mainland close to Goa, which is 180 km east-northeast of Adas Bank. It is not considered part of the Laccadive Islands anymore, but nevertheless one of the northernmost features of the Chagos-Laccadive Ridge. The minimum depth of the bank is 70 meters.

Further reading
William Henry Rosser, James Frederick Imray. The Seaman's Guide to the Navigation of the Indian Ocean and China Sea Including a Description of the Wind, Storms, Tides, Currents, &c., Sailing Directions; a Full Account of All the Islands; with Notes on Making Passages During the Different Seasons. J. Imray & Son, 1867. p. 412.
Alfred Dundas Taylor, James Horsburgh. The India directory, for the guidance of commanders of steamers and sailing vessels, founded upon the work of J. Horsburgh. W. H. Allen & Co., 1874. p. 299.

Landforms of India
Undersea banks of the Indian Ocean